The Polish hip hop scene was born in the early 1990s, due to the popularity of American rap. Nevertheless, rap style in Polish music has its deep roots in the 1980s Polish punk rock, alternative rock, disco and funk music.

Polish hip-hop artists are well-known performers across Europe, especially in the former Eastern Bloc. Many rappers from Poland are collaborating with artists from Europe, the USA and even Cuba.

History
The first album by a Polish performer was East on the Mic by PM Cool Lee, which featured two songs in Polish.  Lee was from Kielce, but Warsaw soon emerged as a center for hip hop, after KOLOR, a radio station, began broadcasting Kolor Shock, hosted by Bogna Świątkowska, Paul Jackson, an African American expatriate, Sylvia Opoku from London, and DJ Volt, whose crew, 1kHz, became performing stars in their own right in 1995.  Volt also founded the first Polish independent hip hop label, Beat Records.  Although the label did not last long, it did introduce groups like Trzyha and Molesta.  In Poznań, PH Kopalnia's Polski Rap - Zakazane Piosenki (Polish rap - Forbidden Songs).
Now known as Liroy, the former PM Cool Lee released Alboom in 1995, which included the hit "Scyzoryk" (Penknife).

The most recognizable Polish hip hop band abroad is probably WWO, which is no longer active since 2006. Sokół (who is also the owner of the Prosto Label and the Prosto Wear company) since then recorded 3 albums with Pono and 2 with Marysia Starosta (who was also Sokół's fiancée). Jędker abandoned the Polish rap scene to make dance music with Robert M as Monopol (for which he is mocked and disrespected by the present Polish rap scene and most of the listeners) and DJ Deszczu Strugi is an owner of Otra Barwa Studio.

List of best-selling hip-hop music artists in Poland

General

Rappers

Bands

Duets

Singers

Producers

Foreign

See also
List of Polish musicians and musical groups#Hip-hop/rap

Notes 
a.  Based on albums certified by Polish Society of the Phonographic Industry: Alboom (1995) - 4xPlatinum - 800,000 copies sold, Bafangoo Cz.1 (1996) - Gold - 100,000 copies sold, L (1997) - Gold - 100,000 copies sold, Dzień Szakala (Bafangoo Cz.2) (1999) - Platinum - 100,000 copies sold, and Bestseller (2001) - Gold - 50,000 copies sold. 
b.  Based on albums certified by Polish Society of the Phonographic Industry: for Slums Attack: Na legalu? (2001) - Platinum - 100,000 copies sold, Najlepszą obroną jest atak (2005) - Gold - 17,500 copies sold, Szacunek ludzi ulicy (2006) - Gold - 15,000 copies sold, Fturując (2006) - Gold - 15,000 copies sold, Reedukacja (2011) - Platinum - 30,000 copies sold, and CNO2 (2012) - Gold - 15,000 copies sold. For Peja: Styl życia G'N.O.J.A. (2008) - Gold - 7,500 copies sold, and Na serio (2009) - Gold - 15,000 copies sold. 
c.  Based on albums certified by Polish Society of the Phonographic Industry: for O.S.T.R.: HollyŁódź (2007) - Gold - 15,000 copies sold, Ja tu tylko sprzątam (2008) - Gold - 15,000 copies sold, O.c.b. (2009) - Gold - 15,000 copies sold, Tylko dla dorosłych (2010) - Platinum - 30,000 copies sold, and Jazz, dwa, trzy (2011) - Platinum - 30,000 copies sold. For O.S.T.R. & Hades: Haos (2014) - 30,000 copies sold. For O.S.T.R. & Marco Polo: Kartagina (2013) - 15,000 copies sold. For POE (Projekt Ostry Emade) Złodzieje zapalniczek (2010) - 15,000 copies sold.
d.  Based on album certified by Polish Society of the Phonographic Industry: Równonoc. Słowiańska Dusza (2012) - Diamond - 75,000 copies sold.
e.  Based on albums certified by Polish Society of the Phonographic Industry: Skandal (1998) - Gold - 50,000 copies sold, and Molesta i kumple (2008) - Gold - 15,000 copies sold.
f.  Based on albums certified by Polish Society of the Phonographic Industry: for Sokół & Marysia Starosta: Czysta brudna prawda (2011) - Platinum - 30,000 copies sold, and Czarna biała magia  (2013) - Platinum - 30,000 copies sold. For Sokół fest Pono: Teraz pieniądz w cenie (2007) - 15,000 copies sold.
g.  Based on albums certified by Polish Society of the Phonographic Industry: Droga (2009) - Gold - 15,000 copies sold, Jedność  (2011) - Gold - 15,000 copies sold, Lojalność (2011) - Gold - 15,000 copies sold, and Braterstwo (2012) - Gold - 15,000 copies sold.
h.  Based on album certified by Polish Society of the Phonographic Industry: W 63 minuty dookoła świata (1998) - Gold - 50,000 copies sold.
i.  Based on albums certified by Polish Society of the Phonographic Industry: Kwiaty zła (2008) - Platinum - 15,000 copies sold , Dowód rzeczowy nr 1 (2010) - Gold - 15,000 copies sold, and Dowód rzeczowy nr 2 (2011) - Gold - 15,000 copies sold.
j.  Based on albums certified by Polish Society of the Phonographic Industry: for Miuosh: Piąta strona świata (2011) - Gold - 15,000 copies sold, and Prosto przed siebie (2012) - Platinum - 30,000 copies sold. Fo Onar & Miuosh Nowe światło (2013) - Gold - 15,000 copies sold.
k.  Based on album certified by Polish Society of the Phonographic Industry: Wideoteka (2003) - Gold - 35,000 copies sold.
l.  Based on albums certified by Polish Society of the Phonographic Industry: WGW (2011) - Gold - 15,000 copies sold, and Jeden z Was (2012) - Gold - 15,000 copies sold.
m.  Based on albums certified by Polish Society of the Phonographic Industry: Witam was w rzeczywistości (2005) - Gold - 15,000 copies sold, and Życie na kredycie (2005) - Gold - 15,000 copies sold.
n.  Based on albums certified by Polish Society of the Phonographic Industry: Nie pytaj o nią (2008) - Gold - 15,000 copies sold, and Zapiski z 1001 nocy (2010) - Gold - 15,000 copies sold.
o.  Based on album certified by Polish Society of the Phonographic Industry: Rekontatk (2012) - Gold - 15,000 copies sold.
p.  Based on albums certified by Polish Society of the Phonographic Industry: for Pezet & Małolat: Dziś w moim mieście  (2010) - Gold - 15,000 copies sold. For Pezet: Radio Pezet. Produkcja Sidney Polak (2012) - Gold - 15,000 copies sold.
q.  Based on album certified by Polish Society of the Phonographic Industry: for Mezo, Tabb & Kasia Wilk: Eudaimonia (2012) - Gold - 15,000 copies sold.
r.  Based on albums certified by Polish Society of the Phonographic Industry: Note2 (2009) - Gold - 7,500 copies sold, FuckTede/Glam Rap (2010) - Gold - 7,500 copies sold, Mefistotedes (2012) - Gold - 7,500 copies sold, and Elliminati (2013) - Gold - 7,500 copies sold.
s.  Based on albums certified by Polish Society of the Phonographic Industry: Złodzieje czasu (2009) - Gold - 7,500 copies sold, Dolina klaunoow (2012) - Gold - 15,000 copies sold.
t.  Based on album certified by Polish Society of the Phonographic Industry: for Łona & Webber: Cztery i pół  (2011) - Gold - 15,000 copies sold.
u.  Based on album certified by Polish Society of the Phonographic Industry: for Kali: 50/50 (2011) - Gold - 7,500 copies sold, Gdy zgaśnie Słońce (2012) - Gold - 15,000 copies sold. For Paluch & Kali: Milion dróg do śmierci (2013) - Gold - 15,000 copies sold. For Paluch: Lepszego życia diler (2013) - Gold - 15,000 copies sold. 
w.  Based on album certified by Polish Society of the Phonographic Industry: 23:55 (2010) - Gold - 15,000 copies sold. 
x.  Based on albums certified by Polish Society of the Phonographic Industry: for Ten Typ Mes: Kandydaci na szaleńców (2011) - Gold - 7,500 copies sold. For Popek: Monster (2013) - Gold - 7,500 copies sold. For Firma: Nasza broń to nasza pasja (2011) - Gold - 5,000 copies sold. For Zeus: Zeus. Nie żyje (2012) - Gold - 15,000 copies sold.  For Parias: Parias (2011) - Gold - 15,000 copies sold.  For Paktofonika: Muzyka z filmu Jesteś Bogiem (2012) - Gold - 15,000 copies sold.
y.  Based on albums certified by Polish Society of the Phonographic Industry:  The Marshall Mathers LP 2 (2004) - Platinum - 20,000 copies sold, Encore (2004) - Gold - 20,000 copies sold, The Eminem Show (2002) - Gold 20,000 copies sold, The Marshall Mathers (2000) - Platinum 40,000 copies sold.

References

Additional sources
 For certification criteria by Polish Society of the Phonographic Industry between 2002-2005 (with time frame) Radek Miszczak, Andrzej Cała: Beaty, Rymy, Życie: Leksykon muzyki hip-hop. Poznań, Poland: Kurpisz S.A., 2005, page 22. .
 For certification criteria by Polish Society of the Phonographic Industry before 2002 (without time frame)